= Rosen Garten Saga =

Japanese manga series

- First tankōbon volume cover

ローゼンガーテン・サーガ (Rōzen Gāten Sagā)
- Genre: Action; Dark comedy; Fantasy
- Manga
- Written by: Sakimori Fuji
- Illustrated by: Bakotsu Tonooka
- Published by: Hero's Inc.
- English publisher: NA: MediBang
- Imprint: Wild Hero's Comics
- Magazine: Comiplex
- Original run: August 21, 2020 – July 17, 2026
- Volumes: 15
- icon

Rosen Garten Saga (ローゼンガーテン・サーガ, Rōzen Gāten Sagā) is a Japanese manga series written by Sakimori Fuji and illustrated by Bakotsu Tonooka. It was serialized on Hero's Inc.'s Comiplex website from August 2020 to July 2026.

== Plot ==
After defeating the dragon Fafnir and other adventures, Siegfried married Kriemhild and became king, while remaining a sexual deviant who regularly has sex with village women. When Siegfried is assassinated, raiders attack a village. Lynn, the only virgin left, finds the sword of Siegfried and is possessed by his ghost, allowing her to defeat her attackers, though in perverted ways like turning them into girls, making them horny, and temporarily giving Lynn a penis so that she can have sex with them. Queen Brunhild and her forces rout the rest of raiders and Lynn quickly becomes smitten with her. The queen invites her to the Rosengarten Schlacht, a tournament where the winner will be rewarded with the treasure Siegfried left behind after his death. Lynn seeks to be worthy of Brunhild while Siegfried seeks an item in the treasure that can resurrect him. The tournament features several figures from history, mythology, and folklore.

== Publication ==
Written by Sakimori Fuji and illustrated by Bakotsu Tonooka, Rosen Garten Saga was serialized on Hero's Inc.'s Comiplex website from August 21, 2020, to July 17, 2026. Its chapters were collected into fifteen tankōbon volumes released from January 31, 2021, to August 27, 2026.

=== Volumes ===
No.	Release date	ISBN
1	January 31, 2021	978-4-86468-780-5
2	June 29, 2021	978-4-86468-815-4
3	November 29, 2021	978-4-86468-841-3
4	March 29, 2022	978-4-86468-877-2
5	August 29, 2022	978-4-86468-122-3
6	January 26, 2023	978-4-86468-150-6
7	May 29, 2023	978-4-86468-172-8
8	September 28, 2023	978-4-86468-203-9
9	January 26, 2024	978-4-86468-232-9
10	May 29, 2024	978-4-86468-257-2
11	October 29, 2024	978-4-86805-014-8
12	February 27, 2025	978-4-86805-047-6
13	May 29, 2025	978-4-86805-070-4
14	October 29, 2025	978-4-86805-119-0
15	August 27, 2026	978-4-86805-215-9

== Reception ==
Joshua Fox of Screen Rant ranked the series as the third best ongoing manga of 2023, praising the series as an incredible battle manga despite its erotic tone. Fox would later put the series eleventh in his "Best Seinen Manga" list praising the series for its artwork and fight choreography.
